Kacha is the name of several rural localities in Russia:
Kacha, Krasnoyarsk Krai, a settlement in Zeledeyevsky Selsoviet of Yemelyanovsky District in Krasnoyarsk Krai
Kacha, Sevastopol, a settlement in Nakhimovsky District of the federal city of Sevastopol

Notes